Speakerpunch is a Dutch rock band which has built a firm live reputation with shows across The Netherlands, playing at venues such as Paradiso (Amsterdam), Mezz (Breda), Baroeg (Rotterdam) and Bibelot (Dordrecht). The band has been praised for its stage performance at various band battles.

History

Formation and debut EP
The band was initiated in 2007 by the bass player Simon which was, next to his current band Sense, looking for another band with which he could share more of his musical preferences. John, the drummer of Sense, shared the musical preference of Simon and Speakerpunch was born. In search of a guitarist, Simon en John met Ed, a funny old guy which turned out to be greatest guitar player in rock history. Martijn, former frontman of sleaze-rockband Quickspanker and funkrockband Terence joined Speakerpunch subsequently.

In 2009 a debut album had been recorded at the Popcentrale in Dordrecht.

In the beginning of 2010 it was decided to expand the band with an extra guitarist. From then on Stefan enlighted Speakerpunch with an extra dimension of sound.

EP 2.0
In 2011 a second EP called EP 2.0 has been recorded and mastered by Starring Audio Productions

Musical style
Speakerpunch produces a high-octane blend of raw energy and blasts grooving guitar riffs, pumping drumbeats and bold lyrics through the pulsing speakers. Rising from sleazy rock and roll with a twist of punk rock, stoner and old-fashioned hard rock, Speakerpunch's sound will hit you like a punch in the face and has been compared to the likes of The Mitsfits, Danko Jones and Peter Pan Speedrock. Straightforward rock music with an attitude for hearty men and women! When the crowd gets in motion, from nodding heads to an utter shove-fest, it's mission accomplished for the band.

Bandmembers
Martijn Vermeulen – vocals
Ed Nederlof – rhythm guitar, backing vocals
John den Engelse – drums
Simon Boudewijn – bass, backing vocals
Stefan Lugtigheid – lead guitar

Discography
EP 1.0

Devils Dancefloor
Backstage
Hey Hey Hey
No Escape

EP 2.0

Blood 'n Fire
Swan Lake
Black Smoke
Begin The Sin

CD Dirty Pleasures
Dirty Pleasures
Swan Lake
Run for Your Life
Pirate Bay
Human Flesh
Black Smoke
Bukkake
Blood and Fire
Anarchy

Future
In the beginning of 2014 Speakerpunch will record its first full-length album.

Awards
In the 2013 Speakerpunch won the well known Dutch band contest The Saturnus Beachbattle

References

External links
Official website

Dutch rock music groups